Jens Oliver Lisberg (24 December 1896 – 31 August 1920) (Jens Olivur Lisberg in modern Faroese) was one of the designers of the Merkið, the flag of the Faroe Islands.

While a law student in Copenhagen, he devised the flag in 1919 with two other Faroese students, Janus Øssursson from Tórshavn and Paul Dahl from Vágur. Lisberg raised the flag for the first time on Faroese soil on 22 June 1919 on returning to his home town of Fámjin. It would not however receive official status until 25 April 1940 when the British occupation government approved its use as the civil ensign of the islands.

Lisberg died of pneumonia on 31 August 1920. He is buried in Fámjin, where the church now holds the original copy of the Merkið.

References
This article is based upon a translation of the equivalent article in the French Wikipedia.

1896 births
1920 deaths
Flag designers
20th-century Faroese people
Deaths from pneumonia in the Faroe Islands